Common preference is an everyone wins situation in a number of places:

Zero-sum game#Non-zero-sum
Taking Children Seriously
Win-win situation